is a metro station in Chūō-ku, Sapporo, Hokkaido, Japan. The station is numbered T10.

Platforms

Surrounding area
 Old Mansion Nagayama, Nagayama Memorial Park
 Hokkaido Electric Power building
 Chuo-ku Higashi Community Development Center
 Sapporo Factory shopping mall
 TV Hokkaido
 Sapporo Municipal Central gymnasium
 Sapporo City Gallery (Museum)
 Hokkaido-Shiki Theatre

Odori Bus Center 
There is the Odori Bus Center just above this station.

Highway buses 
 Wakkanai/Hamanasu; For Wakkanai Station and Wakkanai Ferry Terminal
 Esashi; For Otoineppu Station, Nakatonbetsu, Utanobori, and Esashi
 Aurora; For Nakashibetsu, Betsukai, Attoko Station, and Nemuro Station
 Kushiro Tokkyu New Star; For Shiranuka Station, Otanoshike Station, and Kushiro Station
 Setana; For Oshamambe, Imakane, Kitahiyama, and Setana
 Hakodate Tokkyu New Star; For Goryōkaku Station, Hakodate Station, and Yunokawa Onsen,

References

External links

 Sapporo Subway Stations

 

Railway stations in Japan opened in 1976
Railway stations in Sapporo
Sapporo Municipal Subway
Chūō-ku, Sapporo